Ott is a surname and an Estonian masculine given name (meaning "Bear" but also the Estonian version of the German name, Otto). People with the name include:

Surname

A
Alfredo Ott (born 1983), American basketball player
Alice Sara Ott (born 1988), German-Japanese pianist
Alvin Ott (born 1949), American politician
Anastasiya Ott (born 1988), Russian hurdler
Andrew Ott, American engineer
Anneli Ott (born 1976), Estonian politician

B
Billy Ott (1940–2015), American baseball player
Bobby Ott (born 1962), American speedway rider
Brad Ott (born 1969), American golfer

C
Carlos Ott (born 1946), Uruguayan architect
Charles A. Ott, Jr. (1920–2006), American military commander
Christophe Ott (born 1983), French football goalkeeper

D
David Ott (born 1947), American composer
David N. Ott (1937–2020), American politician and lawyer

E
Ed Ott (born 1951), American baseball player
Elsie Ott (1913–2006), recipient of the Air Medal
Eugen Ott (1889–1977), German diplomat
Eugen Ott (1890–1966), German military commander

F
Fred Ott (1860–1936), American, the first man to be filmed
Friedrich Schmidt-Ott (1860–1956), German lawyer and politician

G
Gottlieb Ott (1832–1882), Swiss building contractor

H
Harry Ott (1933-2005), German diplomat
Harry L. Ott, Jr. (born 1952), American politician
Heinrich Ott (1894–1962), German physicist
Heinrich Ott (fl. 1980s), Swiss bobsledder
Henry Ott (1865-1949), American politician
Horace Ott (born 1933), American songwriter and arranger
Hubert Ott (born 1964), French politician

I
Ingmar Ott (born 1955), Estonian botanist
Isaac Ott (1847–1916), American physiologist

J
Jeff Ott (born 1970), American punk rock musician
Jim Ott (born 1947), American politician
John Ott (1909–2000), American photographer
Jonathan Ott (born 1949), American ethnobotanist and author
Jürg Ott, Swiss geneticist

K
Kerstin Ott (born 1982), German singer, songwriter, guitarist and DJ
Konrad Ott (born 1959), German philosopher

L
Ludwig Ott (1906–1985), German theologian

M
Manuel Ott (born 1992), German football player
Margaret Saunders Ott (1920–2010), American pianist
Mel Ott (1909–1958), American baseball player
Mirjam Ott (born 1972), Swiss curler

N
Niko Ott (born 1945), West German rower

P
Patricia Ott (born 1960), German field hockey player
Peter Ott (1738–1809), Austrian military commander

R
Riki Ott (born 1964), American environmental activist
Russell Ott, American politician

S
Sharon Ott (fl. 20th century), American theatre director
Stanley Joseph Ott (1927–1992), American clergyman
Steve Ott (born 1982), Canadian hockey player (St. Louis Blues)

T
Thorsten Ott (born 1973), German football player

U
Urmas Ott (1955–2008), Estonian journalist

W
Wijnand Ott (born 1955), Dutch musician
Wilhelm Ott (1886–1969), German politician
William Ott (1872–1951), New Zealand politician

Given name
Ott (born 1968), English record producer
Ott Aardam (born 1980), Estonian actor
Ott Arder (1950–2004), Estonian poet and writer
Ott Jud (fl. 15th century), Jewish Austrian martial arts master
Ott Kadarik (born 1976), Estonian architect
Ott-Heinrich Keller (1906–1990), German mathematician
Ott Lepland (born 1987), Estonian singer
Ott Lumi (born 1978), Estonian politician
Ott Reinumäe (born 1984), Estonian footballer
Ott Sepp (born 1982), Estonian actor
Ott Tänak (born 1987), Estonian rally driver
G. Ott Romney (1892–1973), American basketball coach
Paul Ott Carruth, American football player

Fictional
Vernon "Ott" Motley, elder African-American stevedore featured on HBO's The Wire. It is he who is set to take over as treasurer for the union at the end of the show's second season.

See also
Otepää - an Estonian town with a name meaning "Ott's Head" or "Bear's Head".

Estonian masculine given names
Estonian-language surnames
German-language surnames
Surnames from given names